Bitry is the name or part of the name of the following communes in France:

 Bitry, Nièvre, in the Nièvre department
 Bitry, Oise, in the Oise department
 Saint-Pierre-lès-Bitry, in the Oise department